The Hacktivity conference is a traditional event in Budapest, Hungary where official and alternative representatives of the information security profession meet with all those interested in this field in framework which is at the same time informal and informative, and sometimes very in-depth technological. Participants: Official and alternative experts of the information security profession, Universities, colleges, and their professors participating in IT training, Young people participating in high level IT education/university and college students, professional trade unions.

External links
 Hacktivity home page
 Recordings of Hacktivity 2015 in the AV-Portal of German National Library of Science and Technology

Computer security conferences